Dinoponera australis is a species of ant notable for its lack of distinct queen caste.

Subspecies 
Dinoponera australis is divided into three subspecies:

 Dinoponera australis australis Emery, 1901
 Dinoponera australis bucki Borgmeier, 1937
 Dinoponera australis nigricolor Borgmeier, 1937

Description 

Studies have shown that fat storage in this species is related to the division of labour in the colony and non-reproductive individuals are characterized with a lower lipid count than reproductives.

Dinoponera australis has been found to exhibit marked differences in the degree of polyploidy across its tissues, ranging from 2 to 64 copies of the nuclear genome.

Distribution 
Dinoponera australis has the widest known range of the Dinoponera. This species is found in the department of Santa Cruz in Bolivia, southern Brazil in the states of Mato Grosso, Goiás, Minas Gerais, São Paulo, Mato Grosso do Sul, Paraná, Santa Catarina and Rio Grande do Sul, eastern Paraguay in the departments of Itapúa, Alto Paraná and Guairá, as well as the province of Misiones in Argentina.

References

External links 

 Alex Wild Photography: Dinoponera photos

Ponerinae
Hymenoptera of South America
Insects described in 1901